Lionel Edmund Morrison OBE (13 October 1935 – 31 October 2016) was a South African-born British journalist, and a former president of the National Union of Journalists (NUJ). He was the first black journalist to hold that office.

Biography
Morrison, whose grandfather came from the Isle of Lewis in the Outer Hebrides, was born and spent his early life in South Africa, where he set up a multiracial journalists' union in the 1950s in opposition to the apartheid regime. He was arrested for treason in 1956.

Having moved to the UK in 1960, Morrison became a member of the executive council of the National Union of Journalists (NUJ) in 1971, and its president in 1973. Much of his life's work focused on increasing black participation in unionism and journalism, and countering racial discrimination. In the 1970s, finding it difficult to find employment in Britain as a black journalist, Morrison was involved in setting up some of the country's first black newspapers, such as The Voice and the West Indian World. Along with fellow journalist Syd Burke, he also helped to establish journalism courses and further education colleges across London. Morrison was the Principal Information Officer of the Commission for Racial Equality in the 1970s and 1980s. He later became vice-president and Chair of Notting Hill Housing Trust.  An honorary member and life member of the NUJ, he was awarded an OBE in 2000.

He died on 31 October 2016 and is survived by his wife, two sons, grandson and granddaughter.

Anti-Apartheid activism

Freedom Charter and imprisonment

In 1955, Morrison served three months at notorious Johannesburg prison The Fort, for painting slogans on walls in Cape Town. Inspired by the Freedom Charter, he had daubed "Let us Black folk in" on a wall in the parliamentary precinct and "The People Shall Govern" on a wall nearby, resulting in an arrest for graffiti and a sentence of four months imprisonment.

The Treason Trial

On 6 December 1956 Morrison was arrested for high treason against the state, an offence that carried the death penalty, and he was put on trial along with 155 others (including Walter Sisulu and Nelson Mandela).
The preliminary hearings of the Treason Trial began on 19 December at the Drill Hall. Morrison, the youngest defendant, was accused number 89. The prosecution claimed the accused had campaigned to draw up the Freedom Charter which envisaged granting equal rights to all and was tantamount to plotting the overthrow the existing state. The defence team representing Morrison and his co-accused included Vernon Berrange QC and Bram Fischer. In December 1957 the charges against Morrison and 60 others were withdrawn. The trial finally ended on 29 March l961 when the remaining 30 defendants were acquitted.

Sharpeville Massacre

Morrison joined the first act of resistance in 1961 by both the PAC and ANC, a demonstration against the pass laws which required all Africans to carry passes. The Sharpeville Massacre followed. Both liberation organisations were immediately declared illegal. Morrison and many others, including  Mandela and Robert Sobukwe, were arrested resulting in Morrison serving a five-month sentence at the Fort prison until the ending of the State of Emergency.

Journalism in South Africa
In 1955 Morrison worked as a reporter for Golden City Post in Cape Town, South Africa's first black weekly. The all white South African Union of journalists forbade membership of black journalists. Morrison with support of black and white journalists as well as the National Union of Journalists in London, set up the non-racial National Union of South African Journalists (NUSAJ) and became its first acting chair.

Career and activism in the UK

Morrison was elected to the national executive of the National Union of Journalists (NUJ) in 1971, and served at all levels of the union. In 1974 members agreed to set up a race relations working group, with Morrison as its first chair. He first put himself forward for the presidency of the NUJ in 1977, losing to "bloody racism", but triumphed a decade later becoming the first black president in 1987.

Morrison spoke at a Conference at the Eden Project in 2013 on restorative justice, linking it with the Truth and Reconciliation Commission in South Africa  of which he had had some criticisms, and became Patron of RJ Working (2014), an organisation promoting restorative justice in Cornwall.

Publications
As They See it: A Race Relations Study of Three Areas from a Black Viewpoint, Community Relations Commission, 1976
Arts Education in a Multicultural Society, Commission for Racial Equality, 1981 (with Irene Staunton and Tania Rose)
A Century of Black Journalism in Britain: A Kaleidoscopic View of Race and the Media (1893–2003), Truebay Limited, 2007,

References 

1935 births
2016 deaths
British male journalists
South African emigrants to the United Kingdom
South African people of Scottish descent
Officers of the Order of the British Empire
Black British journalists
British trade union leaders
Presidents of the National Union of Journalists